HM HM  is a 2005 Egyptian film.

Synopsis 
This tale depicts the relationship between the waiter and a customer at a restaurant. Where hands and bellies are in action, faces can disappear from the picture. But what happens when lots of food has been consumed?

External links 

2005 films
Egyptian animated films
Egyptian short films